Conrad Heinrich Christoph Willgerodt (2 November 1841 – 19 December 1930) was a German chemist who first described the Willgerodt reaction. Alongside the Willgerodt reaction, he had also discovered Iodosobenzene and chlorobutanol.

As for his career, Conrad Willgerodt was a professor at the University of Freiburg.

References

External links
 

1841 births
1930 deaths
19th-century German chemists
Academic staff of the University of Freiburg
People from Goslar (district)
People from the Duchy of Brunswick
20th-century German chemists